John Phillips (September 11, 1887 – December 18, 1983) was an American businessman and veteran of World War I who served seven terms a member of the U.S. House of Representatives from California from 1943 to 1957.

Early life and career 
John Phillips was born in Wilkes-Barre, Pennsylvania. He moved to St. Davids, Pennsylvania, in 1891. He graduated from Haverford College in 1910.

World War I
He served in the United States Army during World War I, where he served in the Adjutant General's Office and in Ordinance 1917–1919.

He moved to California in 1924 and worked as a business analyst and rancher.

Political career 
He was a member of the city council of Banning, California, 1930–1932. He served in the California Assembly from 1933 to 1937, and was a member of the California Senate from 1937 to 1942. He was a member of the United States delegation to the Eleventh World's Dairy Congress in Berlin in 1937.

Congress 
Phillips was elected as a Republican to the Seventy-eighth and to the six succeeding Congresses. He was not a candidate for renomination in 1956.

He was a delegate to Republican National Conventions in 1944, 1948, 1952, 1956, and 1960.

Private life
He was a member of the American Battle Monuments Commission from 1952 to 1961. He was engaged as a public relations counselor and was a resident of Hemet, California, until his death in Palm Springs, California, on December 18, 1983. Interment in Desert Memorial Park, Cathedral City, California.

References

External links

The Political Graveyard

Join California John R. Phillips

United States Army personnel of World War I
Republican Party members of the California State Assembly
Republican Party California state senators
Politicians from Wilkes-Barre, Pennsylvania
People from Banning, California
1887 births
1983 deaths
Burials at Desert Memorial Park
Republican Party members of the United States House of Representatives from California
20th-century American politicians
Haverford College alumni